Yan Bolagh (also Romanized as Yān Bolāgh and Yānbolāgh; also known as Pān Bolāgh) is a village in Qeshlaq-e Jonubi Rural District, Qeshlaq Dasht District, Bileh Savar County, Ardabil Province, Iran. At the 2006 census, its population was 99, in 21 families.

References 

Populated places in Bileh Savar County